Pristimantis chiastonotus is a species of frog in the family Strabomantidae. It is found in Brazil, French Guiana, Suriname, and possibly Guyana.
Its natural habitats are tropical moist lowland forests, rural gardens, and heavily degraded former forest.
It is threatened by habitat loss.

References

chiastonotus
Amphibians of Brazil
Amphibians of French Guiana
Amphibians of Suriname
Amphibians described in 1977
Taxonomy articles created by Polbot